Kome may refer to:

KOME, defunct radio station in San Jose, California
Kome (Tenos), ancient city on the island of Tenos, Greece
Kome Hyappyo, Japanese term
Kōme Station, train station in Okayama Prefecture, Japan
Kome Rural LLG, Papua New Guinea

People
Daniel N'Gom Kome (born 1980), Cameroonian footballer
Penney Kome, Canadian journalist and magazine editor